Bhat-Bhateni Super Market (BBSM) is the biggest retail supermarket chain of Nepal. The first store was opened in Bhat-Bhateni, Kathmandu in 1984 by Min Bahadur Gurung.  It was opened with an investment of NPR 35000 near Bhat Bhateni Temple at Naxal from where it derives its name.

The chain has store in 23 locations; eleven inside the Kathmandu Valley and eight elsewhere. It employs more than 4,500 full-time employees, with daily sales exceeding NRs 5.5 Crore (US$550,000.00). Bhat-Bhateni is also the largest taxpayer in the retail sector in Nepal.

Stores
The chain has stores in the following locations.

It also owns a warehouse in Baluwatar, Kathmandu.

Controversies
The store has been accused of tax evasions and blackmarkeeting multiple times.
The administration sentenced for imprisonment on Bhat-Bhateni Super Market for selling products at a higher rate in 2020 in Chitwan and Kathmandu.
 A tax evasion case was filed against the supermarket by Inland Revenue Department (IRD) for avoiding value-added tax (VAT) worth NPR 90 million by making fake bills.

See also
List of shopping malls in Nepal

External links
Official Website

References

Companies based in Kathmandu
Retailing in Nepal
1984 establishments in Nepal